Ben Hardy (born Ben Jones; 2 January 1991) is an English actor. He is known for playing Peter Beale in the BBC soap opera EastEnders (2013–2015). Hardy made his film debut as Archangel in the superhero film X-Men: Apocalypse (2016) and played Roger Taylor in the biographical film Bohemian Rhapsody (2018).

Early life
Hardy was born in Bournemouth, Dorset, and grew up in Sherborne. He attended Sherborne Abbey Primary School and the Gryphon School. As a student at Gryphon, Hardy starred as Sergeant Francis Troy in a school film adaptation of Far from the Madding Crowd.

Career
In 2012, Hardy starred as Arthur Wellesley in the David Hare play The Judas Kiss, also featuring Rupert Everett. The production initially had a limited run at the Hampstead Theatre from September to October 2012 followed by a short tour to Bath, Richmond, Brighton and Cambridge before, after rave reviews, transferring to the West End's Duke of York's Theatre in January 2013. His role required him to perform full frontal nudity, which he later described as "incredibly nerve-racking."

On 19 April 2013, it was announced that Hardy would play Peter Beale in the long-running BBC soap opera EastEnders, taking over from Thomas Law who portrayed the character from 2006 until 2010. Hardy said: "I'm really excited to be joining the fantastic cast of EastEnders – a show which my family have watched for years. I can't wait to step into the shoes of a character with so much history and am looking forward to getting stuck in." He made his first appearance on 7 June 2013. On 19 November 2014, it was announced that Hardy would leave the series. He made his final appearance on 24 February 2015.

Hardy made his film debut in Bryan Singer's superhero film X-Men: Apocalypse, released on 27 May 2016, co-starring as the winged mutant Archangel. He was subsequently cast as writer John William Polidori in Haifaa Al-Mansour's period romance film Mary Shelley, opposite Elle Fanning and Douglas Booth. Hardy portrayed Granite Mountain Hotshots firefighter Wade Parker, who lost his life in the 2013 Yarnell Hill Fire, in Joseph Kosinski's action-drama Only the Brave. The film, co-starring Josh Brolin and Miles Teller, was released on 22 September 2017.

In April 2018, he played the lead role of Walter Hartright in the BBC adaptation of the Wilkie Collins novel The Woman in White.

Hardy played Queen drummer Roger Taylor in the 2018 biographical film Bohemian Rhapsody, which earned him a nomination for Outstanding Performance by a Cast in a Motion Picture at the 25th Screen Actors Guild Awards.

In 2018, it was announced that Hardy was cast in the Netflix action thriller film 6 Underground, directed by Michael Bay. The film was released on 13 December 2019.

In 2020, Hardy played Frank in the movie Pixie, alongside Olivia Cooke and Daryl McCormack, among others and directed by Barnaby Thompson.

In January 2021, Hardy joined the romantic film The Statistical Probability of Love at First Sight, playing Oliver alongside Haley Lu Richardson. As for March 2021, Hardy has been cast for the HBO MAX and BBC One series The Girl Before.

Filmography

Film

Television

Stage

Awards and nominations

References

External links

 
 
 
 

1991 births
21st-century English male actors
Male actors from Dorset
English male soap opera actors
English male film actors
English male stage actors
Living people
Actors from Bournemouth
People from Sherborne